Niranjani Agathiyan  (born 8 June 1986) is an Indian actress, costume designer and fashion stylist who works in the Tamil film industry. She is the daughter of film Director Agathiyan.

Career
After she gained experience in working with Nalini Sriram, Agathiyan went on to work for herself, entering the mainstream in Sigaram Thodu (2014), Kaaviya Thalaivan and Kabali (2016).

Filmography

As costume designer 
Vaayai Moodi Pesavum (2014)
Sigaram Thodu (2014)
Kaaviya Thalaivan (2014)
Trisha Illana Nayanthara (2015)
Kathakali (2016)
Pencil (2016)
Kaballi (2016)
Enakku Vaaitha Adimaigal (2017)
Bairavaa (2017) 
Namma Veettu Pillai (2019) 
Kannum Kannum Kollaiyadithaal (2020)

As actress 
 Kannum Kannum Kollaiyadithaal (2020)

Awards
 Vijay Awards for Kaaviya Thalaivan
 Ananda Vikatan for Kabali

References

External links
 

Living people
Indian costume designers
Fashion stylists
Artists from Chennai
Women artists from Tamil Nadu
21st-century Indian designers
21st-century Indian women artists
Indian film actresses
Actresses from Chennai
Actresses in Tamil cinema
21st-century Indian actresses
1986 births